The original alignment of Kentucky Route 67 (KY 67) was a north–south primary state highway that traversed Edmonson and Warren counties in south central Kentucky. It was one of the original state routes of the state highway system maintained by the Kentucky Transportation Cabinet. It was established in 1929 and was officially decommissioned in 1969.

Route description
KY 67's original route began at an intersection with U.S. Route 68 (US 68) in downtown Bowling Green. At the time of KY 67's existence, the route's southern terminus was located within a stretch of US 68 and KY 80 where the two concurrently running routes were in a two-way split on State and College Streets, a few blocks northeast of the campus of Western Kentucky State College (now Western Kentucky University). From the State Street intersection, KY 67 followed Main Street (now Main Avenue) for  before making a right turn onto Gordon Avenue to exit the city and cross the Barren River. The highway originally ran through parts of northern Warren County, including the unincorporated community of Anna, but passing just east of Richardsville.

At Glenmore, KY 67 intersected KY 185, which branched into the far eastern part of Butler County. KY 67 then crossed the Green River into Edmonson County via the Bear Creek Ferry, which was a toll ferry situated extremely close to the Butler-Edmonson-Warren County tripoint, and not too far upstream from the then-U.S. Army Corps of Engineers-operated Green River Lock and Dam Number 5. Most traffic from northern and western Edmonson County heading to Bowling Green used this ferry for convenience. The tolls ranged from 10 to 30 cents each time the driver went one way on the ferry during the 1960s. After crossing the ferry, KY 67 went further north-northeastward to the community of Segal, where it had a junction with the original KY 555 (Segal Road), which is now KY 655. After that, KY 67 followed the present-day KY 655 for the remainder of its current eastward course when it passed through Segal and Asphalt and it finally met its northern terminus at Windyville, where it intersected KY 70.

History

Road history 
As one of the state's charter state routes formed in 1929, KY 67 underwent some changes throughout its estimated 38-year-long existence, including some reroutings to straighten out the highway in one spot on the north side of Bowling Green, complete with a new bridge over the Barren River, which opened to traffic in 1957. The Bear Creek Ferry was one of several ferryboats that traversed the Green River during the early days of the state highway system; it was one of a few remaining ferries in the area when a feature article on the area's ferries was published in a September 1956 edition of the Bowling Green Daily News.

Discontinuation of the ferry
At one point sometime around the 1966-67 fiscal year, the Bear Creek Ferry was decommissioned. Hence, KY 67 no longer connected from the Asphalt–Segal area to Warren County, which was the reason the Edmonson County section of KY 67 was decommissioned sometime prior to 1968. The Warren County section was still signed as KY 67 until sometime in the 1969-70 fiscal year, when the KY 185 alignment in Warren County was rerouted to follow KY 67's course from Bowling Green to KY 185's original southern terminus near Glenmore. A portion of the original KY 67 between KY 185 and the Wingfield Road intersection is now part of KY 1749. Ownership of the remainder of the road from KY 1749 in Glenmore to the ferry site on the Warren County side reverted to the Warren County Road Department as Lock 5 Road, while the road on the Edmonson County side between the ferry site and the Segal community reverted to the Edmonson County Road Department, and became Mouth of Bear Creek Road.

The ferry site is now just a boat ramp, but local residents still use that area for recreational purposes such as boating or fishing.

Change of routes from Edmonson to Warren County
Since the discontinuation of the Bear Creek Ferry, residents of northern Edmonson County were forced to make alternate routes that adds more time to their commute, depending on where the resident lives in. Option A was for Edmonson County residents to use KY 70 westbound to Roundhill to turn left on KY 185 for their commute to Bowling Green. This option was used for many residents along Edmonson County's western boundary with Butler County. Option B, on the other hand, is to go through Brownsville (the Edmonson County seat) using Kentucky Routes 259 and 101 to enter Warren County, and to make a right turn on U.S. Route 31W. That option is mainly used by people traveling to Bowling Green from the central part Edmonson County (i.e. Brownsville, Lindseyville, Sweeden, and Bee Spring).

The new KY 67
 
The KY 67 designation returned to the Kentucky highway system in 2002 to be was assigned to the then-new Industrial Parkway in northeastern Kentucky. KY 67 now follows a route from the exit 179 interchange of Interstate 64 (I-64) in northern Carter County to US 23 near Greenup.

Major intersections

Related roads

Mouth of Bear Creek Road

Mouth of Bear Creek Road is a locally maintained road located in Edmonson County, Kentucky. The road was part of an original alignment of the original KY 67 from that state highway's 1929 establishment until its decommissioning in 1967.

Kentucky Route 655

Kentucky Route 655 (KY 655) is a rural secondary state highway in Edmonson County. The latter  of KY 655, along with the county-maintained Mouth of Bear Creek Road, was the original course of KY 67 through the area until the 1967 decommissioning of that route, connecting the Windyville-Asphalt-Segal area directly to Warren County. KY 655 is currently a C-shaped route serving as a farm-to-market style road that meanders around the area, both termini are with intersections with KY 70.

See also

References

External links
Kentucky Transportation Cabinet
Bing Maps - reference source for purpose of current highway alignments.

0067
0067
0067